Lord Malcolm may refer to:

John Malcolm, 1st Baron Malcolm (1833-1902), Scottish soldier and politician.
Colin Campbell, Lord Malcolm (b. 1953), Scottish lawyer and Senator of the College of Justice.